Sarai Alamgir

Sarai Alamgir - is the chief town of the tehsil of the Sarai Alamgir Tehsil in Pakistan
Sarai Alamgir Tehsil  is the  tehsil in Pakistan